Noon (Village ID 89305) is a village in Jalor district in the Indian state of Rajasthan. The village is surrounded by four rivers. According to the 2011 census it has a population of 3946 living in 688 households. Its main agriculture product is jeera growing. A temple dedicated to the Hindu deity, Shiva is located there. Paapiyo Ki Nagari Noon is the only village in Jalore with an aeroplane runway.

References

Villages in Jalore district